Ov or OV may refer to:

Places
 Ocean View, Virginia, a community in the city of Norfolk, Virginia
 Oost-Vlaanderen (East Flanders), a province in Flanders, Belgium
 Oro Valley, a town in Arizona, United States of America
 Overijssel, a province in the Netherlands

People
 Alexander Ovechkin, NHL hockey player
 Orifice Vulgatron, a member of the rap group Foreign Beggars

Brands
 Organic Valley, one of the world's largest organic food brands

Organizations
 SalamAir, a low cost airline from Oman (IATA code OV)
 Orange Volunteers, a loyalist paramilitary group in Northern Ireland

Arts and entertainment
 Original voice, the original voice of a motion picture
 OV, a 2005 album by Orthrelm
 OVGuide, a website aggregator
OV Album by MOUSV *mousa sam*

Science and technology
 Orbiter Vehicle, a term for a NASA Space Shuttle
 Orbiting Vehicle, a series of satellites operated by the US Air Force
 OpenView, an HP network and systems management software product
 Organization validation, a type of public key certificate

Linguistics
 A suffix found in surnames of Bulgarian and Russian men; see Russian names and Bulgarian names
 openbaar vervoer (Dutch for "public transport"), as in OV-chipkaart

Other uses
 In the Bible, one of two forms of prohibited witchcraft; see Ov and Yidoni
 Old Vienna, a beer

See also
 Orbital vehicle (disambiguation)